Belgium was represented by synthpop band Telex, with the song "Euro-Vision", at the 1980 Eurovision Song Contest, which took place on 19 April in The Hague. Synthpop had never previously been tried in a Eurovision final, and the choice of song and group caused much comment, particularly regarding the implied sarcasm directed towards Eurovision in the song's deliberately banal lyrics.

Before Eurovision

Concours Eurovision de la Chanson - Finale nationale 
French-language broadcaster RTBF was in charge of the selection of the Belgian entry for the 1980 Contest. The final took place at the RTBF studios in Brussels, hosted by former Belgian Eurovision entrant Jean Vallée. Seven songs participated in the selection and the winner was chosen by an expert jury. Telex were the winners of the national final. The title of one of the songs is currently missing.

At Eurovision 
On the night of the final Telex performed last in the running order, following Spain. It was the first time that a song of this nature had been entered for Eurovision, and the audience reaction was somewhat bewildered, as if they were unsure whether or not it was meant to be a joke entry. The reaction was largely shared by the juries, as at the close of the voting "Euro-Vision" had received only 14 points, placing Belgium 17th of the 19 entries. Singer Marc Moulin later claimed that the band had hoped to finish last and blamed the Portuguese jury for thwarthing their aims, although how much of this was bravado after a bad result in the contest is open to conjecture. The Belgian jury awarded its 12 points to contest winners Ireland.

Voting

References 

1980
Countries in the Eurovision Song Contest 1980
Eurovision